Du Shi (d. 38) was a Chinese hydrologist, inventor, mechanical engineer, metallurgist, and politician of the Eastern Han Dynasty. Du Shi is credited with being the first to apply hydraulic power (i.e. a waterwheel) to operate bellows (air-blowing device) in metallurgy. His invention was used to operate piston-bellows of the blast furnace and then cupola furnace in order to forge cast iron, which had been known in China since the 6th century BC. He worked as a censorial officer and administrator of several places during the reign of Emperor Guangwu of Han. He also led a brief military campaign in which he eliminated a small bandit army under Yang Yi (d. 26).

Life

Early career
Although the year of his birth is uncertain, it is known that Du Shi was born in Henei, Henan province. Du Shi became an Officer of Merit in his local commandery before receiving an appointment in 23 as a government clerk under Gengshi Emperor (r. 23–25), following the revolt against the Xin Dynasty usurper Wang Mang (r. 9–23). However, Du soon after swore his allegiance to Emperor Guangwu of Han (r. 25–57), who is considered the true founder of the Eastern Han Dynasty (25–220).

Censorate officer
Under Emperor Guangwu, Du Shi was appointed as an officer in the Censorate and was in charge of monitoring affairs and upholding law and order within the new capital at Luoyang. When the undisciplined troops of the military officer Xiao Guang (d. 26) ran rampant in the capital city and terrorized its inhabitants without any perceivable action on Xiao's part to prevent it, Du Shi had him arrested. Du had Xiao summarily executed without explicit consent from the throne, sending in a report of the event only after the execution. Guangwu was not displeased with this, as he called him into his court to grant him an insignia which justified his actions. Shortly after this event, the bandit leader Yang Yi (d. 26) caused a major disturbance in Hedong Commandery, which Du Shi was sent to quell. When word of the arrival of Du Shi's forces in the region reached Yang Yi, he planned to flee across the Yellow River. However, Du Shi anticipated this, sending a raiding party to burn the boats Yang Yi intended to use for his escape. After conscripting troops from the Hedong Commandery, Du Shi led a surprise ambush with a cavalry unit that dispersed Yang's bandits and annihilated them.

Administrator
For three years, Du served as a county magistrate in Henan province where his administration gained wide acclaim from provincial authorities. Afterwards, Du distinguished himself as a Commandant in Pei and in Runan. In 31 he was appointed as an administrator over Nanyang. While serving there, he had an array of dykes and canals built for land reclamation and growth of local agriculture. It is here that he also developed a water-powered reciprocator for bellows in smelting cast iron, a machine which reportedly saved an enormous amount of physical labor. It is recorded that the locals were so fond of him that they often referred to him as "Mother Du" and compared him to noteworthy figures of history, such as Shao Xinchen of the Western Han era.

Du Shi was by all means a local administrator, yet he also made recommendations to the imperial court on policy issues. He recommended that the Tiger Tallies system be reinstated. This was a means for imperial authorities to check possible official corruption in the forgery of mobilization of troops for war. Du also nominated several minor officials he deemed worthy as candidates for higher posts in the capital, including Fu Zhang. In a memorial of 37, he urged the court to consider Fu as the next Imperial Secretary.

Death
Du Shi's reputation was damaged in 38 when he was accused of having one of his retainers sent to kill a man out of vengeance for his brother. In that same year, Du became ill and died. Despite Du's long-standing official career, the Director of Retainers Bao Yong reported that no proper funeral ceremony could be arranged for Du, since Du was nearly broke when he died. However, the Emperor had an imperial edict made which granted Du a proper funeral ceremony at his commandery residence in the capital, along with silk to pay for the expenditures.

The Water-Powered Blast Furnace

Book of Later Han account
The engineer and statesman Du Shi is mentioned briefly in the Book of Later Han (Hou Han Shu) as follows (in Wade-Giles spelling):

Donald B. Wagner writes that there is no remaining physical evidence of the bellows which Du Shi used, so modern scholars are still unable to determine whether or not they were made of leather or giant wooden fans as described later in the 14th century.

Spread of Use

The historical text Sanguo Zhi (Records of the Three Kingdoms) records the use of both human labor and horse-power to operate metallurgic bellows of a blast furnace before water-power was applied. It also records that the engineer and Prefect of Luoling Han Ji (d. 238) reinvented a similar water-powered bellows that Du Shi had earlier pioneered. Two decades after this, it is recorded that another design for water-powered bellows was created by Du Yu (222–285). In the 5th-century text of the Wu Chang Ji, its author Pi Ling wrote that a planned, artificial lake had been constructed in the Yuanjia reign period (424–429) for the sole purpose of powering water wheels aiding the smelting and casting processes of the Chinese iron industry. The 5th-century text Shui Jing Zhu mentions the use of rushing river water to power waterwheels, as does the Tang Dynasty (618–907) geography text of the Yuanhe Jun Xian Tu Chi, written in 814 AD.

Although Du Shi is the first historical figure to apply water power to metallurgic bellows, the oldest extant Chinese illustration depicting such a device in operation can be seen in a picture of the Nong Shu, printed by 1313 AD during the Yuan Dynasty (1271–1368) of China. The text was written by Wang Zhen, who explained the methods used for a water-powered blast-furnace (Wade-Giles spelling):

See also
Antipater of Thessalonica
List of Chinese people
Trip hammer

Notes

References
de Crespigny, Rafe. (2007). A Biographical Dictionary of Later Han to the Three Kingdoms (23-220 AD). Leiden: Koninklijke Brill. .
Needham, Joseph (1986). Science and Civilization in China: Volume 4, Part 2. Taipei: Caves Books, Ltd.
Wagner, Donald B. (2001). The State and the Iron Industry in Han China. Copenhagen: Nordic Institute of Asian Studies Publishing. .

External links
History of waterwheels

38 deaths
Chemists from Henan
Chinese civil engineers
Chinese hydrologists
Chinese inventors
Chinese mechanical engineers
Chinese metallurgists
Engineers from Henan
Han dynasty politicians from Henan
Hydraulic engineers
Political office-holders in Henan
Politicians from Xinxiang
Year of birth unknown